Thotapalli Barrage is located in Garugubilli Mandal, Parvathipuram Manyam district of Andhra Pradesh State. It was named after the freedom fighter and Political leader Sardar Gouthu Latchanna. The project construction was in between 2003 and 2015. This Project was inaugurated by Andhra Pradesh Chief Minister Nara Chandra babu Naidu on 10 September 2015. The Project provides irrigation to 1,20,000 acres in Srikakulam and Parvathipuram Manyam  districts.

In 1908, the old Thotapalli regulator was constructed across the Nagavali River with a 64,000 acres irrigation potential. The regulator was replaced by the current barrage which has a 2.51 Tmcft storage capacity and an additional 56,000 acres irrigation potential.

See also
 List of dams and reservoirs in India
 Andhra Pradesh

References

Barrages in India
Dams in Andhra Pradesh
Buildings and structures in Vizianagaram district
Transport in Vizianagaram district
Dams completed in 2015
2015 establishments in Andhra Pradesh
Uttarandhra